Al-Farooq Masjid is a mosque in Atlanta, Georgia, United States. Founded in 1980, the mosque is one of the largest in the Southeastern United States. The current building, located in Atlanta's Home Park neighborhood, was completed in 2008.

History 
Al-Farooq Masjid was founded in 1980 in response to a growing population of South Asian Muslims (mostly Pakistani) and Arab Muslims in the city, including students from the nearby Georgia Institute of Technology (Georgia Tech). The mosque was the first majority-immigrant mosque in the city, though several mosques serving African-American Muslims were present in the city at the time. It was established in Home Park, a neighborhood close to Georgia Tech's campus. The mosque later established a cemetery, and in the 1990s they opened two schools. In 1990, the mosque opened a K-8 school, and in 1992 another school was opened, focusing on Islamic studies. Al-Farooq later established an affiliated mosque in Norcross, Georgia.

In 1999, the mosque began a series of renovations, and in 2003, construction began on a new mosque building. This building, which cost $10 million, was completed in 2008. The new building features two copper domes, the larger of which reminiscent of the Dome of the Rock in Jerusalem, and can hold an estimated 5,000 people. The new octagonal-shpaed building also features a tall minaret, mashrabiya-covered balconies, and entryways featuring pointed arches. As of 2015, the mosque averaged approximately 1,000 attendees to Friday prayer sessions.

References

Bibliography

External links 
 
 

1980 establishments in Georgia (U.S. state)
Arab-American culture
Asian-American culture in Georgia (U.S. state)
Islamic organizations established in 1980
Islam in Georgia (U.S. state)
Buildings and structures in Atlanta
Midtown Atlanta
Mosques completed in 2008
Mosques in the United States
Pakistani-American culture
Religion in Atlanta
Religious buildings and structures in Georgia (U.S. state)
South Asian American culture